Social Suicide is a 2015 British romantic drama and psychological thriller film starring India Eisley and Jackson Bews.  Inspired by William Shakespeare's Romeo and Juliet, the film reunited Olivia Hussey (Eisley's real-life mother) and Leonard Whiting for the first time since the 1968 film adaptation.

Plot
The film is about a group of teenage friends who are regular viners, posting their videos on the internet with the hope of becoming popular. The main characters are Balthazar, Reese, Marc, Julia, and Julia's cousin Ty. Other chief characters are Detective Dalton and his staff of investigators, including IT experts and a psychologist, Laurence Emerson.

Balthazar is an obsessive guy who always carries a camera in the hopes of achieving internet virality. He is taking medicines for anxiety and anger. His friend Reese is in love with Julia, who came close with the intent to make videos together. Both are popular YouTubers, and people like them for what they post. However, Balthazar is submissive and socially awkward and is jealous of this couple.

Marc and Ty are found dead, and a team of investigators takes Balthazar into custody for interrogation. He seems scared and confused to the psychologist but deceptive to Detective Dalton from the beginning. One of the reasons Dalton suspects Balthazar to be the chief suspect because of his obsession with making videos. She has a teenage daughter who makes fitness videos in bikinis to become popular, and Dalton is upset by that. So she presumably takes out her anger at Bal when she suspects him without any evidence. But Balthazar, too, lies on several occasions and changes his version of the whole incident when he is scared. At these times, a psychologist comes to his rescue. The film revolves around finding proof from a prime piece of evidence in the form of a memory card with a true version of what happened that night, filmed by Balthazar. The detectives have to see how much Balthazar is speaking the truth and whether there is something more to the story. To the viewer's surprise, the film takes a horrifying turn when the truth is finally revealed from the memory card video.

Most of these teenagers in the film are shown as disturbed, lack family connections, and are lonely. They make decisions that are misinformed and risky. They don't understand the consequences of their behaviors and interests. While leaving police custody, when the psychologist Emerson suggests Balthazar stop making videos and go for participatory activities in the real social world, Balthazar seems totally ignorant of the message in his words and tells him that now he is going to make the video that deserves 1 million views. Psychologists supported Balthazar throughout the film with the hope of giving him warmth and understanding of his condition. Still, all went to waste as Bal was so occupied with his upcoming popularity. Bal seems unaware of what harm this video craze has done to him and brought his friends into trouble. The movie shows very closely the delicate make-up of the teenage mind and how things can go wrong if parents don't pay much attention and do not connect with them emotionally.

Cast
India Eisley as Julia Coulson
Olivia Hussey as Mrs. Coulson
Neve McIntosh as Detective Dalton
Leonard Whiting as Mr. Coulson
Aymen Hamdouchi as Hughie
Richard Cordery as Laurence Emerson
Shaquille Ali-Yebuah as Marc
Georgia Lock as Rozi
Jackson Bews as Balthazar
Rollo Skinner as Reese Mattson
Zac Fox as Junior Tech
Barney White as Ty
Gio Fonseca as Justin
Luke Mordue as Young Cop
Christian Di Sciullo as Cop
Meg McNaughton as Family Friend
Jurgen Schwarz as Custody Officer
Eleanor Thorn as Sarah
Katy Helps as Police Woman
Millie Mason as Millie
Alistair Donegan as O'Rourke
Vicky Peirson as Registrar
Bethan Williams-James as Baked Bean Girl

References

External links
 
 

2015 films
British romantic drama films
British thriller drama films
British thriller films
Films based on Romeo and Juliet
2010s English-language films
2010s British films